Little Sister (Italian:Il colchico e la rosa) is a 1921 Italian silent film directed by Herbert Brenon and starring Marie Doro.

Cast
 Mina D'Orvella 
 Marie Doro 
 Angelo Gallina 
 Mimi 
 Marcella Sabbatini 
 Sandro Salvini

References

Bibliography
 Phillips, Alastair & Vincendeau, Ginette. Journeys of Desire: European Actors in Hollywood. British Film Institute, 2006.

External links

1921 films
1920s Italian-language films
Films directed by Herbert Brenon
Italian silent feature films
Films shot in Italy
Italian black-and-white films